The name Kreol may be

any of many creole peoples or creole languages
Haitian Creole, also known as Kreol Ayisyen
Mauritian Creole, also known as Kreol Morisien
Seychelles Creole, also known as Kreol Seselwa
Kreol (software), a software MIDI instrument

See also

Creole peoples
Creole language
Criol
Criollo (disambiguation)
Krio (disambiguation)
Kriol (disambiguation)
Kreyol (disambiguation)
Kriolu